The Qulonggongba Formation is a Late Triassic (Norian) geologic formation in Nyalam County, Tibet, near to the border with Nepal, that is part of the Langjiexue Group. It would have been a marine environment and the Qulonggongba Formation was first identified by Z-M Dong in 1972.

Paleofauna
Veteranella (Ledoides) langnongensis
Himalayasaurus tibetensis
Hybodontidae indet.

References 

Geologic formations of Asia
Norian Stage
Late Triassic Asia
Nyalam County